is a magical girl anime television series produced by Pierrot which aired from 1983 to 1984 on Nippon Television. It went on to have four OVA adaptions and featured in other Studio Pierrot special presentations. A three-volume manga was released during the original TV run, with the story written by Kazunori Itō and art by Yuuko Kitagawa. This was the first magical girl anime to be produced by Pierrot, and the first original work from the studio. In 2005, the web poll for TV Asahi's top-100 anime of all time saw Creamy Mami, the Magic Angel poll 82nd. The series is currently streaming in North America via Tubi, RetroCrush, Amazon Prime, Midnight Pulp, and AsianCrush, as of Spring 2020. Thus far, a limited DVD release of all 52 episodes has been successfully crowd-funded at Anime Sols.

Story

Yū Morisawa is an ordinary 10-year-old girl, until she sees a spaceship floating in the sky. Carried into the ship, she helps a friendly alien called Pino Pino find the Feather Star. In thanks for her assistance he grants her a magical wand, which allows her to transform into a 16-year-old girl, for one year. She is also given two cats from Feather Star, Posi and Nega, who are to watch over her while she has magical powers. While wandering around the city as a teenager, she accidentally ends up on TV and asked to sing, which the magic enables her to do remarkably well. Using the alias of Creamy Mami, she becomes an overnight success, and is soon sought to begin a professional career as an idol under Parthenon Productions. Along the way, she also meets past residents of Feather Star and supernatural beings. In addition, she must fight against Snake Joe, a shady character of the rival LP Productions, who is always trying to steal her away and Megumi-chan, another one of Parthenon Productions' top stars.

Characters
  / 
 
 A normal 10-year-old girl, Yū harbours a secret crush for her childhood friend Toshio Ōtomo. Given the ability to transform into a 16-year-old girl, she is made to fill in for the absent Megumi Ayase to sing on TV. Naming herself Creamy Mami, she becomes an overnight hit. Throughout the series, it is a running gag for Mami to frequently be late for appearances like concerts, television filmings, and signings, or always makes it perfectly in the nick of time.

 
 
 One of the two cats from the Feather Star asked to watch over Yū Morisawa while she has magical powers. His name is short for negative. Nega was the one who taught Yū the words which allow her to transform into Creamy Mami, and he also secretly knows other magical words, but avoids telling them since Yū might end up using her powers for self gain like cheating in a surprise school test. Despite this Yū tricked him into saying the magical words to generate a pen which can answer any question in one of the episodes. He, despite his brash attitude, really likes Yū a lot that he even mistook a girl named Cassidy for her.

 
 
 One of the two cats from the Feather Star asked to watch over Yū Morisawa while she has magical powers. Her name is short for positive. She is very supportive of Yu and it sometimes annoys Nega. When Yū failed to transform for the first time, she suggested using the magic wand while saying the magic words which led to a successful transformation. Her voice actress also say the titles of every episode.

 
 
 Friend of Yū Morisawa and Midori Kisaragi, he falls in love with Creamy Mami after her first TV appearance. He frequently goes to Creamy Mami's concerts and appearances. Halfway through the series until episode 25, Toshio sees Yu transform into Mami, which causes her to lose her magic. Yu and Toshio later travel to Feather Star where Pino Pino gives Yu a new wand to use magic with in exchange for Toshio's memory of Yu using magic, to which he agrees. Later, he finds a tape of him recording the incident and begins to remember. In the end he finally understands that Mami was Yū all long and that he was in love with Yū all this time and didn't realize it. In episode 47, Toshio says that he is 14, making him presumably 13 at the beginning of the series.

 
 
 A spoiled and selfish idol who is the star of Parthenon Productions. She feels threatened by the newcomer, Creamy Mami, and declares herself to be Mami's rival. She is particularly jealous of Shingo's affection for Mami as an idol and person, as Megumi is hinted to be in love with him.

 
 
 President of Parthenon Productions, he quickly recognizes Creamy Mami as a future sensation, and tries to make her into a star. It is hinted that he is in love with Megumi and Mami.
 
 
 Megumi Ayase's bumbling manager who is moved to managing Creamy Mami when she joins Parthenon Productions. He is continuously subjected to various unfortunate situations and gags, as well as the reprimands of Shingo when Mami is late or anything goes wrong.

 
 
 Toshio Ōtomo's best friend, Midori is in love with Yū Morisawa and seeks to tell her this. Because of his bashfulness, he needs Toshio's help to do this.

 
 
 Wife of Tetsuo, and mother of Yū, Natsume works in Creamy with her husband. She used to be the leader of a motorcycle gang. Her and her husband own Creamy Crepe making crepes. 

 
 
 Husband of Natsume, and father of Yū, Tetsuo works in Creamy with his wife. He used to be a member of Natsume's motorcycle gang. Tetsuo almost discovered Yû when she transformed for the first time, however she managed to trick him.

 
 
 A struggling writer, Wān is a loyal customer of Creamy and frequently drops by with his piles of pointless but brilliant manuscripts.

 
 
 An alien being, Pino Pino grants Yū Morisawa magical powers for one year in thanks for helping him find the Feather Star.

 
 
 A boy which recently got transferred to Yû's school who came from a small town in Hokkaido. He seemed to be pretty rude at first, but later became friends with Yû due to his huge love for cats. He says he can listen what the wind says and was one of the few people who realized Nega and Posi aren't normal cats. Mamoru at first doesn't know many things about big cities and was annoyed due to the fact Creamy Ga-Oka had such small threes. He was pretty outdated with news that he even doesn't know who Creamy Mami was, plus when asked he thought it was a name of a crepe. Despite being a major character, Mamoru never had any real contact with Mami.

Episode list

Music

Original songs
By Creamy Mami/Takako Ohta
  (OP)
  (ED 1)
  (ED 2)
 
 
 
 
 
  (Long Good-bye OVA OP)
 
 I CAN`T SAY "BYE-BYE" (Curtain Call OVA ED)
  (Curtain Call OVA OP)
 Ma Wa Le Mi Gi (with Saeko Shimazu) (Curtain Call OVA insert song)

By Megumi Ayase/Saeko Shimazu

Tribute album
A tribute album was released on February 9, 2011 and features covers by modern voice actors and rerecorded versions by or with Takako Ohta and Saeko Shimazu.
 MA・WA・LE・MI・GI by Takako Ohta and Tomoe Shinohara
 Beautiful Shock by Rin Suzuki
 Delicate ni Sukishite by Marina Inoue
 The Medicine That Works Best for You by Chie Nakamura
 Girls Talk by Mariya Ise
 Heart's Season by Eri Kitamura
 Memory of the Beach by Tomoe Shinohara
 Last Kiss of Good Luck! by Saeko Shimazu
 I Can't Say "Bye-Bye" by Takako Ohta
 MA・WA・LE・MI・GI by Takako Ohta and Saeko Shimazu
 Missing Kiss by Takako Ohta
 Bin Kan Rouge by Yukari Fukui
 Miracle Angel by Yuka Iguchi
 Love Nonchalantly by Yu Kobayashi
 Staying in My Pajamas by Aya Endo
 Whispering Je t'aime by Hiroko Kasahara

Impact and influence
Creamy Mami is known as a pioneer of the new marketing strategy, now known as media mix.
They used an anime to promote a new, least-known idol singer.
The real idol singer, Takako Ōta, acted as an idol singer (Creamy Mami) also in the story.
The opening theme Delicate ni Suki Shite was her first song in the real world too.
Even though Ohta was a new singer and not a trained voice actress, she voiced Yū/Creamy Mami.
The result was a great success.
The anime Creamy Mami has become famous and Ohta gained a high popularity that still exists today.
In 1999, Fuji TV's show Kaishingeki TV Utaemon had a poll to decide the most popular old TV theme song for a 25-year-old audience, and Delicate ni Suki Shite was ranked first. This anime has been repeatedly broadcast over the Internet too.
As of writing (2006-08-08), people in Japan can legally watch the show on-demand for free on GyaO.

The same media mix approach was seen in Idol Densetsu Eriko (1989) and Idol Tenshi Youkoso Yōko (1990).
The anime version of Full Moon o Sagashite (2002) shared the same format too.
Another example is Lemon Angel (1987).
Using an anime to promote a singer was not a new concept, as there was Pink Lady Monogatari (1978), a popular anime at the time.

Creamy Mami set the format that would be used for future Studio Pierrot magical girl titles, and was especially influential in Fancy Lala. Creamy Mami also stars in Adesugata Mahou no Sannin Musume, along with Magical Emi and Persia, as well as Majokko Club Yoningumi A-Kukan Kara no Alien X, with Magical Emi, Persia and Pastel Yumi. The popularity of the series not only saw two feature-length sequels, but Creamy Mami also featured in five music video-based productions, starting with the 1985 OVA Lovely Serenade. The second of the feature-length sequels, Magical Angel Creamy Mami Long Goodbye, began with the short animation Mahō no Tenshi Creamy Mami VS Mahō no Princess Minky Momo Gekijou no Daikessen, and where Creamy Mami battled against Ashi Productions' Minky Momo.

Creamy Mami's companions Posi and Nega were also parodied in Gainax's 1991 OAV Otaku no Video, in which Misty May (the magical girl character created by the series' protagonist) has two lion cub companions named Posi-King and Nega-King. (The character design for both is based on King the lion cub, a companion of the title character in Gainax's 1990 TV series Nadia: The Secret of Blue Water.)

Producer Yuji Nunokawa noted that there was a substantial increase in male fans after Creamy Mami'''s broadcast due to the shows' use of transformations and enjoyed watching girls using magic to solve their problems in ways men traditionally could not.

A spin-off manga series titled, Magical Angel Creamy Mami and the Spoiled Princess, was launched Coamix's Comic Tatan website on December 21, 2018. The series is written and illustrated by Emi Mitsuki. The series focuses on the character, Megumi Ayase. The series was released in North America in March 2021 by Seven Seas Entertainment.

InternationalizationMagical Angel Creamy Mami was dubbed into Italian by Studio PV, who released it as L'incantevole Creamy from 1985-02-03. It was also broadcast in France by La Cinq (later on TMC, AB1 and Manga) as Creamy, merveilleuse Creamy from April 29, 1988, and more recently released in French DVD editions (French dub or Japanese and French subtitles) by Declic Image. It was also distributed in Spain as "El Broche Encantado" in 1992.

In these countries the musical theme was the same: in Italy it was sung by Cristina D'Avena, in France by Claude Lombard and in Spain by Soledad "Sol" Pilas.

The text and music were by Alessandra Valeri Manera - Giordano Bruno Martelli.

The musical base was partially re-orchestrated in France and Spain, and the text was translated and adapted by Charles Level for the French version.

It was dubbed into Cantonese by a Hong Kong TV Station - TVB, who released it as "我係小忌廉" (I am Creamy Mami) from January 7, 1985 showing it from Monday to Friday at 6pm, each time shown half an hour.

Harmony Gold USA (the company best known for the Robotech adaptation) was planning an English dubbed version under the name Pretty Creamy the Perfect Pop Star'', but it never saw the light of day. Had it ever been released in English, most of the characters' names would have to be changed to target an English-speaking audience.

References

External links
Creamy Magical World English (and French) site about Creamy Mami.
 

Official sites
Japanese at Studio Pierrot.

Internet Movie Database

1983 anime television series debuts
1983 manga
1984 anime OVAs
1985 anime OVAs
1986 anime OVAs
Fictional shapeshifters
Japanese idols in anime and manga
Japanese webcomics
Josei manga
Kodansha manga
Magical girl anime and manga
Nippon TV original programming
Pierrot (company)
Seven Seas Entertainment titles
Shōjo manga
Webcomics in print